Robert Angus McKenzie (13 March 1936 – 25 September 2022) was a British fencer. He competed in the team foil event at the 1960 Summer Olympics.

McKenzie died on 25 September 2022, at the age of 86.

References

1936 births
2022 deaths
British male fencers
Fencers at the 1960 Summer Olympics
Olympic fencers of Great Britain
People from Richmond, London
Sportspeople from London